Giovanni Antonio Onorati (died 1606) was a Roman Catholic prelate who served as Bishop of Terni (1591–1606).

Biography
On 20 November 1591, Giovanni Antonio Onorati was appointed during the papacy of Pope Innocent IX as Bishop of Terni.
On 30 November 1591, he was consecrated bishop by Girolamo Bernerio, Bishop of Ascoli Piceno, with Galeazzo Moroni, Bishop of Macerata e Tolentino, and Ottavio Abbiosi, Bishop of Pistoia, serving as co-consecrators. 
He served as Bishop of Terni until his death in 1606.

References

External links and additional sources
 (for Chronology of Bishops) 
 (for Chronology of Bishops) 

16th-century Italian Roman Catholic bishops
17th-century Italian Roman Catholic bishops
Bishops appointed by Pope Innocent IX
1606 deaths